What's Up Warthogs! is a Canadian sitcom that aired on Family. It follows two teen rivals – Victoria and Eric – who with the help of best friend, Charlie, and crazed genius, Laney, come together and make the morning announcements into a show. The show premiered on March 11, 2011 on Family, and it was the first series shown on the launch of Disney XD (Canada) on June 1, 2011.

Cast and characters

Main
 Karissa Lee Staples as Victoria Jagger
 Tiago Abreu as Eric Ortiz
 Eduard Witzke as Charlee McGuinness
 Ana Golja as Laney Nielsen

Recurring
 Duane Murray as Mr. Denovi

Special guest stars
 Connor Price as Teddy Chadwick IV
 Zak Long as Dex Kubrick
 David Fraser as Jerry the Janitor
 Argiris Karras as JJ Kay
 Michael Murphy as Freshman Newsie
 Amanda Joy Lim as Susie Kang
 Sidney Leeder as Cindy
 David Reale as Warty
 Aidan Shipley as Money Melvin
 Genevieve Kang as Kara Lee Burk
 Dylan Everett as Randy

Episodes

Season 1 (2011)

Season 2 (2012)

International release
It premiered on Disney Channel UK as a sneak peek for the Summer of 2011 and made its full debut in November 2011. NZ TV Channel FOUR is currently showing the world premiere of episodes after episode 8.

References

External links
 Official website
 

2010s Canadian high school television series
2010s Canadian teen sitcoms
2011 Canadian television series debuts
2012 Canadian television series endings
Family Channel (Canadian TV network) original programming
English-language television shows
Television series about teenagers
Television shows filmed in Toronto
Television shows set in Toronto